Kenneth J. Brown (November 8, 1945 – January 11, 2001) was an American football running back in the National Football League. He played for the Cleveland Browns from 1970 to 1975.

References

1945 births
2001 deaths
People from Holdenville, Oklahoma
Players of American football from Oklahoma
American football running backs
American football return specialists
Cleveland Browns players